Evolve is the second live DVD by Japanese rock band Coldrain, which was released on April 30, 2014.

The Blu-ray contains the making of the album The Revelation. The end credits of the DVD/Blu-ray is the song "Believe" from the second maxi-single "8AM".

Due to the COVID-19 pandemic, many of Coldrain's gigs were forced to be postponed or cancelled. To entertain fans during the lockdown period, they released Evolve for free on YouTube for a limited amount of time.

Track listing
"Evolve" was released in CD, DVD and Blu-ray formats.

CD

DVD and Blu-Ray

Blu-ray extra features

Personnel
  – lead vocals 
  – lead guitar
  – rhythm guitar, backing vocals
  – bass guitar, backing vocals
  – drums

Charts

References

External links

 

Coldrain albums
2014 live albums